Airlink is the name of a South African regional airline.

Airlink may also refer to:

Airlines
 Airlink (Papua New Guinea), Papua New Guinea
 Airlink (Finland), Finland
 Zimbabwe Airlink of Zimbabwe
 Swaziland Airlink of Swaziland
 Air Link of Australia
 Air Link International Airways of the Philippines
 Airlink Zambia of Zambia
 Airwaves Airlink of Zambia
 Northwest Airlink, of the United States
 Vieques Air Link of Puerto Rico

Other
 Airlink (helicopter), a helicopter shuttle service which operated between Gatwick and Heathrow airports in the UK between 1978 and 1986
 AirLink Communications, a company acquired by Sierra Wireless
 AirLinks, a former brand used by National Express Coaches